The black-faced firefinch (Lagonosticta larvata) is a common species of estrildid finch found in Africa. It has an estimated global extent of occurrence of 2,100,000 km2.

It is found in Benin, Burkina Faso, Cameroon, Central African Republic, Chad, The Democratic Republic of the Congo, Côte d'Ivoire, Ethiopia, Gambia, Ghana, Guinea-Bissau, Mali, Niger, Nigeria, Senegal, Sierra Leone, Sudan, Togo and Uganda. The status of the species is evaluated as Least Concern.

Lagonosticta vinacea was a separate species, but findings by Dowsett and Forbes-Watson in 1993 led to reassigning of the L. vinacea species as a population under L. larvata.

References

BirdLife Species Factsheet

black-faced firefinch
Birds of Sub-Saharan Africa
black-faced firefinch